Rotermanni Quarter is an area in the downtown of Tallinn, Estonia. It is located between Tallinn Old Town, the Port of Tallinn and Viru Square.  

This area has played an important role in Tallinn's history; in the 19th century it was the crossing of roads from Tartu, Narva and Pärnu. There were also other big industrial companies in the area.

The developer of the quarter is Rotermann City OÜ (founded by Urmas Sõõrumaa). Over the years they have been working together with architectural bureaus Kosmos (Mihkel Tüür, Villem Tomiste, Ott Kadarik), KOKO Architects (Andrus Kõresaar, Raivo Kotov), Alver Architects (Andres Alver, Indrek Rünkla), Teigar Sova Architects (Vahur Sova), HG Architecture (Hanno Grossschmidt, Tomomi Hayashi) and Emil Urbel Architectural Bureau.

Renovations have been done on the barley, wheat and rye mill, sampling mill, boiler plant, and power plant. The carpenter’s workshop with its three techno-futuristic exterior towers was shortlisted for the European Union Prize for Contemporary Architecture in 2009. The new flour storage was joined to the old flour storage using an atrium. The elevator building was awarded in 2016 by the National Heritage Board recognising the best renovated building. The renovations of the last historic building, a bread factory, was concluded in 2021 

The new buildings have been named Orange, Brown, White, Black, Golden and Red houses. Streets have been renamed to Rotermanni Street, Roseni Street and Stalker gangway, in the centre of the area is a public square called the Rotermanni Square. 

The area of the buildings is over 50,000 square meters, including over 370 apartments and about 600 underground parking spaces.

References 

Tallinn